"Brand New Key" is a pop song written and sung by folk music singer Melanie. Initially a track of Melanie's album Gather Me, produced by Melanie's husband Peter Schekeryk, it was known also as "The Rollerskate Song" due to its chorus. It was her greatest success, scoring No. 1 on the Billboard Hot 100 singles chart during December 1971 and January 1972. Billboard ranked it as the No. 9 song of 1972. It also scored No. 1 in Canada and Australia and No. 4 on the UK Singles Chart.

Overview
The song is sung from the viewpoint of a girl with roller skates trying to attract the attention of a boy.

In an interview with Examiner.com, Melanie described what she claimed was the inspiration for the song: "I was fasting with a 27-day fast on water. I broke the fast and went back to my life living in New Jersey and we were going to a flea market around six in the morning. On the way back… and I had just broken the fast, from the flea market, we passed a McDonald's and the aroma hit me, and I had been a vegetarian before the fast. So we pulled into the McDonald's and I got the whole works... the burger, the shake, and the fries… and no sooner after I finished that last bite of my burger… that song was in my head. The aroma brought back memories of roller skating and learning to ride a bike and the vision of my dad holding the back fender of the tire. And me saying to my dad... 'You’re holding, you’re holding, you’re holding, right?' Then I’d look back and he wasn’t holding and I’d fall. So that whole thing came back to me and came out in this song."

The song has been described as folk music, pop music, and soft rock. It was arranged by Roger Kellaway.

Possible sexual innuendo 
Melanie has acknowledged the possibility of detecting sexual innuendo in the lyrics, but has denied any deeper meaning:

Track listings and formats
 7" vinyl
 "Brand New Key"  – 2:26
 "Some Say (I Got Devil)"  – 3:07

Charts

Weekly charts

Year-end charts

All-time charts

Certifications

Parodies and other versions
A version of the song entitled the "Combine Harvester", with new rustic-themed lyrics by Irish songwriter Brendan O'Shaughnessy (including "I've got a brand new combine harvester An' I'll give you the key"), was recorded by Irish comedian Brendan Grace, whose version scored No. 1 on the Irish Charts during 1975. For the UK Singles Chart, West Country comedy folk act The Wurzels scored No. 1 for two weeks during June 1976 with a version of this.

A parody of the song titled "Kinky Boots" by The Irish Brigade, with lyrics mocking British policies and policing authorities in Northern Ireland in the 1970s and 1980s.

A cover of the song by punk rock band “The Dollyrots” was included on their album Because I'm Awesome.

A cover of the song by the American cello rock trio “Rasputina” was included on their 1996 debut album Thanks For The Ether.

References in popular culture

Podcast
Theme song of the podcast “Wife of the Party” hosted by, popular comedian Bert Kreischer’s wife, LeeAnn Kreischer.

Movies
Melanie's version is heard in the 1997 film Boogie Nights as Dirk Diggler (Mark Wahlberg) has his "audition" with Rollergirl (Heather Graham) in front of Jack Horner (Burt Reynolds). 

The song is also played in Jackass 3-D during the "Bungee Boogie" stunt skit (in which the cast members use bungee cords, skateboards and a ramp to slingshot into a kiddie pool). 

In the 9th season episode of Mystery Science Theater 3000, "Werewolf", Mike sings part of the song's chorus in a medley set to the film's end credits.

TV shows

The original version appears in season one of the FX show The Bridge, as the character Daniel Frye flushes his supply of drugs and alcohol.

The original version also appears in the 2016 Hallmark TV movie Signed sealed delivered from the heart.

On April 4, 2016, Jimmy Fallon lip synced the song during a "Lip Sync Battle" on The Tonight Show Starring Jimmy Fallon, while he competed with actress Melissa McCarthy.

During the 16th season of American Idol, contestant Maddie Poppe performed the song during the Top 24 elimination round.

The original version appears in episode 1 of the first season of the 2017 Australian television series Sisters, as the viewer is initially introduced to Julia, one of the main characters.

Melanie's version is heard playing over the closing credits of the 2nd episode of the 2020 miniseries The Stand, right after Randall Flagg gives Lloyd Henreid a stone that transforms into a key, and frees him from prison. It is also heard in the 2021 It's Always Sunny in Philadelphia episode, "The Gang Buys a Roller Rink", when Frank drops Dennis and Dee off at South Philly Skate in 1998.

The song is played during the "Apocalypse DJ" running sketch portion of the third episode of the 2022 The Kids in the Hall revival series. The sketches depict a radio DJ (played by Dave Foley) playing the song over and over again in the aftermath of an apocalypse caused by a "DNA Bomb".

The song is also heard in Family Guy season 20, episode 18, "Girlfriend, Eh?".

The Voice
On the October 17, 2016, episode of singing competition television show The Voice, Team Miley (Cyrus) contestants Darby Walker and Karlee Metzger performed the song in a Battle round. 

In the first online episode of the Comeback Stage of the singing competition television show The Voice, no-chair reject Klea Olson performed the song as part of a Battle round against fellow Team Bebe (Rexha) members Nathan and Chesi Arnett, who performed the song "Tulsa Time."

References

External links
 

1971 singles
1972 singles
1976 singles
British pop songs
Melanie (singer) songs
Number-one singles in New Zealand
Number-one singles in South Africa
Number-one singles in Australia
Billboard Hot 100 number-one singles
Cashbox number-one singles
1971 songs
Obscenity controversies in music